Awqa Urqu (Quechua awqa enemy, urqu mountain, "enemy mountain", Hispanicized spelling Auca Orjo) is a   mountain in the Chunta mountain range in the Andes of Peru. It is situated in the Huancavelica Region, Castrovirreyna Province, Aurahuá District. Awqa Urqu lies southeast of Wichinka Lake.

References

Mountains of Huancavelica Region
Mountains of Peru